Coleophora preisseckeri is a moth of the family Coleophoridae. It is found from Spain, France, Italy, Austria, Slovenia, Croatia, Hungary, Slovakia, Romania, Ukraine, southern Russia, North Macedonia and Turkey.

References

preisseckeri
Moths of Europe
Moths of Asia
Moths described in 1942